Worthing, a seaside town on the West Sussex coast in southeast England, has received many royal visits since Princess Amelia spent five months recovering from an injured knee in 1798.  The patronage of the 15-year-old daughter of King George III helped Worthing develop from a modest village into a high-class resort favoured by wealthy people seeking a quieter alternative to nearby Brighton's fashionable vulgarity.  Other members of the British Royal Family were regular visitors during the first half of the 19th century, when Worthing's prestige was at its highest.  Queen Elizabeth II first visited in 1951 when she was still Princess Elizabeth, and regular visits have been made by other members of the British Royal Family since then.  Foreign royal visitors include Haile Selassie I of Ethiopia, who spent several weeks in a seafront hotel as a refugee during his exile.

Worthing's royal connections

Brighton,  to the east, experienced a surge in popularity in the mid-18th century, when it was identified by local doctor Richard Russell as an ideal venue to receive his "seawater cure", involving bathing in and drinking seawater.  Regular visits and temporary residency by members of the British Royal Family attracted rich, upper-class visitors who wanted to experience the range of pleasures on offer.  This growth gradually had an effect on towns and villages elsewhere on the Sussex coast.

Worthing was a small fishing and farming village south of the ancient manor of Broadwater.  It had transport links to Brighton, and enjoyed an even better climate than that of its neighbour because of its more sheltered location.  In 1798, King George III's youngest daughter, Princess Amelia, injured her knee.  The king's doctors sought a suitable seaside venue for her recuperation, where she could let her leg heal while improving her fragile health with sea-bathing and the seawater cure.  They chose Worthing, and she eventually spent five months in the village.

The visit was very successful—Amelia's health improved considerably—and the local authorities spent the next ten years developing Worthing as a high-class seaside resort and spa town, with amenities designed to attract fashionable visitors.  By the time Princess Charlotte Augusta of Wales paid a visit in 1807, Worthing was a self-governing town with more than 2,000 residents and an array of facilities from a chapel to a theatre.  More members of the Royal Family visited throughout the 19th century, even though Worthing's period of bold growth ended in about 1830, after which the town went into a decline from which it never fully recovered.  By the time long-term growth started again in the late 19th century, the town had become a destination for quiet, low-key holidays and a residential area popular with retired people.

Queen Elizabeth The Queen Mother had a long association with Worthing, and with the Goring Hall estate in particular.  Goring Hall, an independent school from 1937 until 1988 and now a private hospital, was originally a residence built for Major David Lyon in 1840; it passed from him to other members of the Bowes-Lyon family, of which Elizabeth was a member, until its sale in 1934.  She often visited the house and its grounds as a child; and later in her life she intervened to prevent the felling of trees in the grounds.  She was president of the Queen Alexandra Hospital Home at Gifford House in West Worthing—a home for disabled ex-service personnel—and visited several times.

List of royal visits by date

References

Notes

Bibliography

 
 
 
 

Worthing
History of West Sussex
Royal visits
Royal visits to Wothing